Stara Kuźnica may refer to the following places:

Stara Kuźnica, Greater Poland Voivodeship (west-central Poland)
Stara Kuźnica, Silesian Voivodeship (south Poland)
Stara Kuźnica, Świętokrzyskie Voivodeship (south-central Poland)

See also
Kuźnica (disambiguation)